Orde is a surname. Notable people with the surname include:

 Cuthbert Orde (1888–1968), British war artist
 Hugh Orde (born 1958), senior British police officer 
 Julian Orde (1917–1974), female English poet, writer and actor
 Sir John Orde, 1st Baronet (1751–1824), British Royal Navy officer